The Pixie-bob is a breed of domestic cat claimed to be the progeny of naturally occurring bobcat hybrids. However, DNA testing has failed to detect bobcat marker genes, and Pixie-bobs are considered wholly domestic for the purposes of ownership, cat fancy registration, and import and export. They were, however, selected and bred to look like American bobcats.

History
In the spring of 1985, Carol Ann Brewer purchased near Mount Baker, Washington, a unique male cat with a spotted coat, a short tail, and polydactyl paws. In January 1986, she rescued another male cat named Keba, which was very large, had a bobbed tail, and was reported to have been sired by a bobcat. While this cat was starving, it still weighed 17 pounds, and was so tall it reached up to Brewer's knees. Shortly after she had acquired this large male, it mated with a next door neighbor's brown spotted female cat. In April 1986, a litter was born from this mating. Brewer eventually kept one of the female kittens, named "Pixie", and after a year started a breeding program with Pixie as the foundation cat.

Over the next couple of years, Brewer introduced into her program 23 cats from around the nearby Cascade range, that were believed by her to be born from naturally occurring matings between bobcats and domestic cats. She coined the term "Legend Cat" to refer to such cats and has since registered a trademark in the U.S. to limit the term to describe permitted outcrosses used in her breeding program. At the same time, other breeders in the U.S. were working with distinctly wild looking barn cats and collaborated with Brewer to establish a broad genetic base and to develop the foundation of today's Pixie-bob.

Led by Brewer, they succeeded in registering their new breed with The International Cat Association (TICA) and eventually the American Cat Fancier's Association (ACFA). The Pixie-bob was accepted into the "Exhibition" category by TICA in 1993, promoted to "New Breed and Color" status in 1996 and eventually gained Championship status in 1998. The Pixie-bob was classified by TICA initially as a "Native New Breed", defined as "A new breed which has been identified through selection of phenotypically similar individuals from a naturally occurring population indigenous to a particular geographic region" but it is now classified as an established breed.

Frank Ditto attempted to patent the Pixie-bob in 1999, but his application was rejected by the United States Patent and Trademark Office. Successive litigation upheld the rejection.

Breed standard 
Pixie-bobs are a fully domestic breed of cat selected and bred to resemble the North American bobcat.

Pixie-bobs can be large but on average reach around 11 lb (5 kg), similar to good sized domestic cats, with only very few breeders producing consistently large cats. They are usually large-boned, muscular and massive. Males are most times larger than females. The average domestic cat weighs about 8 lb (4 kg). Pixie-bobs grow up to for four years instead of one year like most domestic cats.

Most Pixie-bobs have black fur and skin on the bottom of their paws, tipped ears, heavy ear hair, black lips, and white fur around the eyes but with black eye skin. Their muzzle is large with round whisker pads and a red nose leather. Their chins have white fur, but often have black skin under the white fur. Some of their whiskers change from black (root – about 25%) to white (to the tip – about 75% of the whisker). Their bobcat-like fur pattern often has reddish tones mixed in. Most are short-haired, but some are long-haired. The brow should be heavy and the eyes should have a triangular shape. Eyes are blue when kittens, then change to green or gold when several months old. Tail size can range from 2 inches (approximately 5 cm) to hock length when leg is extended. The head is pear-shaped and is considered to be the most important characteristic.

It is not presently known what genetic similarity there may or may not be between the Pixie-bob and other breeds with suppression of the tail, such as the Manx, American Bobtail, and Japanese Bobtail.

Temperament
Pixie-bobs are said to be highly intelligent, social, active, bold, and enjoy playing with other animals. They are also known for their "chirps", chatters, and growls; most meow scarcely if at all.

Most Pixie-bobs are highly sociable around both their owners and strangers. Almost all Pixie-bobs like to be in the same room as their owners, and will follow them around the house.

Other personality characteristics include the following:

 Head butting
 Ball fetching and playing
 Leash walking (for the most part)
 Highly intelligent
 Capable of understanding some words

Health
As the breed is frequently outcrossed to "legend cats", Pixie-bobs are genetically diverse and are not prone to problems caused by inbreeding. Pixie-bob breeders use a disease database, Pawpeds, to ensure that health information can be recorded and monitored.

Some genetic conditions include the following:

 Cryptorchidism – only a few cases have been recorded in Pixie-bobs since the conception of this breed in the 1980s.
 Dystocia and cystic endometrial hyperplasia – A very small percentage of Pixie-bobs do suffer from delivery problems, and are removed from breeding.
 Hypertrophic cardiomyopathy (HCM) – Since the advent of the Pixie-bob breed in the 1980s, only a few cases have been reported. In some of those cases the Pixie-bob was cross-bred with other breeds of cats, such as Bengal and Maine Coon. In the majority of cases, HCM occurred spontaneously. HCM is hereditary in at least 50% of occurrences requiring annual ultrasound screens to continuously monitor the good health of the cats.
Blocked tear ducts

See also
 Felid hybrid
 Polydactyl cat

References

External links

 International Pixie-bob pedigree database

Cat breeds
Cat breeds originating in the United States
Cat breeds and types with suppressed tails